The Las Vegas Story is the third studio album by American rock band The Gun Club, released in 1984. This album saw the return of founding member and lead guitarist Kid Congo Powers, after a three-year stint with The Cramps. The album was dedicated to Debbie Harry "for her love, help and encouragement."

Track listing
All songs composed by Jeffrey Lee Pierce; except where indicated

Personnel

The Gun Club
 Jeffrey Lee Pierce – vocals, guitars, bells, musical tube, montage and piano on "The Master Plan"
 Kid Congo Powers – excessive feedback, guitar and slide guitar, whirling whirlies, maracas and ancient mutterings
 Patricia Morrison – bass, backing vocals, maracas and Bacardi
 Terry Graham – drums

Additional musicians
 Mustang Dave Alvin – lead guitar on "Eternally Is Here" and "The Stranger in Our Town"
 The Synanon Reeds (Lois Graham and Phast Phreddie Patterson) - wooden recorders on "The Master Plan"

Production
Jeff Eyrich - producer
Mark Ettel - engineer
Judy Clapp - assistant engineer
Bernie Grundman - mastering
Gillian Titus - art direction, design
Tom Campbell - front cover photograph

References

External links
 

1984 albums
Cooking Vinyl albums
I.R.S. Records albums
The Gun Club albums
Albums produced by Jeff Eyrich